The Pali-Aike volcanic field is a volcanic field along the Argentina–Chile border. It is part of a family of back-arc volcanoes in Patagonia, which formed from processes involving the collision of the Chile Ridge with the Peru–Chile Trench. It lies farther east than the Austral Volcanic Zone, the volcanic arc that makes up the Andean Volcanic Belt at this latitude. Pali-Aike formed over sedimentary rock of Magallanes Basin, a Jurassic-age basin starting from the late Miocene as a consequence of regional tectonic events.

The volcanic field consists of an older plateau basalt formation and younger volcanic centres in the form of pyroclastic cones, scoria cones, maars and associated lava flows. The vents often form local alignments along lineaments or faults, and there are a number of maars and other lakes, both volcanic and non-volcanic. The volcanic field is noteworthy for the presence of large amounts of xenoliths in its rocks and because the maar Potrok Aike is located here, where palaeoclimate data have been obtained. The field was active starting from 3.78million years ago. The latest eruptions occurred during the Holocene, as indicated by the burial of archaeological artifacts; the Laguna Azul maar formed about 3,400years before present.

Humans have lived in the region for thousands of years, and a number of archaeological sites such as the Fell Cave are located in the field. Presently, parts of the volcanic field are protected areas in Chile and Argentina, and the city of Rio Gallegos in Argentina is within  of the volcanic field.

Name 

The name Pali-Aike comes from the Tehuelche language, where  means "hunger" and  means "location". Originally it was the name of a farm (estancia) and was later applied to the volcanic field.

Human geography 

The Pali-Aike volcanic field spans the border between Argentina and Chile, northwest of the Magellanes Strait. Most of the field lies in Argentina within the southernmost part of Santa Cruz Province, while the Chilean part is in the commune of San Gregorio, Chile. The cities of Rio Gallegos (Argentina) and Punta Arenas (Chile) lie northeast and southwest of Pali-Aike respectively. The Monte Aymond border pass lies next to the volcanic field and Argentine National Route 3 passes through the Pali-Aike volcanic field. The border crossing Paso Integración Austral lies next to the volcanic field. On the Chilean side there are hiking trails.

Geography and structure

Local 

This plateau is formed by tables containing depressions and lakes, and whose margins are steep-dipping slopes that accumulate blocks at their feet. It includes remnants of individual volcanic centres, and some volcanic necks situated in the westcentral part of the field may be the formerly underground components of now-eroded volcanic edifices. Among these volcanic necks are the Cuadrado, Domeyko, Gay and Philippi hills, which conspicuously stick out of the surrounding plains. The volcanic rocks were emplaced atop Tertiary-age sediments, which were smoothened by glacial action. The sediments are often unstable and prone to mass wasting and landslides. 

There are 467 volcanic vents in the field. Nested craters, breached craters and fissure vents are common among the various vents, as are lava flows, but there has been little research on the scoria cones. Pyroclastic cones in Pali-Aike include Aymond, Colorado, Dinero, Fell and Negro. The vent Cerro del Diablo, a pyroclastic cone, is the youngest volcano in the field and has emitted both ʻaʻā and pahoehoe lava, which have a fresh appearance and no soil cover. The vents were origins of lava flows, which sometimes breached the vents. Some flows are older and covered with soil while younger ones are not. Such young lava flows also have surface features including lava tunnels, hornitos, tumuli and a wrinkled surface. Some of these are heavily eroded while the southeastern part of the field features fresh-looking centres, where they form the "Basaltos del Diablo". The individual volcanoes are subdivided into three groups, which are referred to as "U1" (the plateau lavas), "U2" (the older centres) and "U3" (for the more recent vents).

Maars are depressions in the ground which are encircled by a ring of sediment that rises above the surrounding terrain; they typically form where frozen or liquid water interacts with rising magma and causes explosions. The periglacial ground is rich in ice and water, which might explain why there are so many maars in Pali-Aike. Notable among these lakes is Laguna Azul, a crater lake which is located within a pyroclastic ring at the side of a scoria cone. This maar formed during three stages in three separate craters and is also the source of a lava flow. Potrok Aike in comparison is much larger (crater diameter of ); its rim is barely recognizable and appears to be more akin to a maar. Additional maars in the southwestern part of the field are the so-called "West Maar" and "East Maar", which contain the lakes Laguna Salsa and Laguna del Ruido respectively, Bismarck, Carlota, Los Flamencos, Laguna Salida/Laguna Ana and Timone Lake.

A number of vents form various alignments, usually along northwestsoutheast and eastnortheastwestsouthwest lines; some older centres show a northsouth pattern. Such alignments occur when local lineations act as a pathway for magma to ascend to the crust and control not only the position of the vents, but also the shape of the volcanoes forming on top of the vents. These lines match the strike of the Magallanes-Fagnano fault zone and the older Patagonian Austral Rift. Faults within the field have been active in the Tertiary and into the Holocene, and a graben in the southwestern part of the field has diverted lava flows.

The Gallegos River passes north of the volcanic field, while its tributary Rio Chico crosses the volcanic field from southwest to northeast. The terrain of the field is highly permeable to water, which later forms wetlands that attract a number of birds and springs that are used as a source of water. Maars are not the only water bodies within the field; lakes formed by lava dams, glacial lakes and lakes formed by wind deflation also exist. Some of these water bodies dry up late in summer, allowing wind to remove sediments from their lakebeds, which thus become the origin of long dune fields. Active growth of such windstreaks has been observed in Pali-Aike. Windstreaks are an uncommon occurrence on Earth; they are much more common on Mars.

Regional 

Pali-Aike is part of the Patagonian back-arc, a province of plateau lavas of Cenozoic age. These plateau lavas are of alkaline to tholeiitic composition; hawaiite, trachyandesite and trachyte are present in smaller amounts. From south to north these plateau lavas include Pali-Aike itself, Meseta Vizcachas, Meseta de la Muerte, Gran Meseta Central, Meseta Buenos Aires, Cerro Pedrero, Meseta de Somuncura, Pino Hachado and Buta Ranquil. Their activity began 16million years ago, when the Chile Ridge collided with the Peru–Chile Trench and thus caused a tear in the subducting slab and the formation of a slab window beneath Patagonia. Another theory is that slab rollback might instead be the mechanism by which volcanism is triggered in the Pali-Aike region. The age trends of volcanism have been interpreted as indicating either a southward migration or a northeastward one in the case of the plateau lavas, following the movement of the triple junction to the north; in that case Pali-Aike would be an exception, probably due to local tectonic effects. However, some older plateau lavas in the north formed in response to an earlier ridge subduction event in the Eocene and Palaeocene.

Geology 

This subduction process has caused adakitic volcanism on the western margin of southernmost South America, forming the Austral Volcanic Zone.

Patagonia is a region where four tectonic plates, the Antarctic Plate, the Nazca Plate, the Scotia Plate and the South America Plate, interact. Starting 4million years ago the Chile Ridge collided with the Peru–Chile Trench. This collision originally occurred west of Tierra del Fuego, but has since moved northward towards the Taitao Peninsula. Farther south the interaction between the Scotia and South America plates gave rise to the Deseado and Magallanes-Fagnano faults.

Composition 

The Pali-Aike volcanic field is mainly made up of alkali basalt and basanite, which form a sodium-rich alkaline suite; nephelinite has been reported and hawaiite is rare. The most important phenocrystic phase is olivine, which also appears as xenocrysts; other minerals include clinopyroxene, diopside and plagioclase. The groundmass has a similar composition with the addition of augite, feldspar and magnetite and occasionally ilmenite and nepheline. Pali-Aike rocks typically feature ultramafic xenoliths containing augite, dunite, eclogite, garnet, harzburgite, lherzolite, peridotite, phlogopite, pyroxenite, spinel and wehrlites. The composition of these xenoliths indicates that they originated from both the crust and the mantle. In addition, rocks from Pali-Aike contain inclusions of fluids consisting of carbon dioxide.

Elemental composition is typical for alkaline intraplate basalts. The geochemistry of Pali-Aike rocks has been interpreted as originating from the melting of peridotite in the mantle along with fractionation of olivine and with residual garnet; there is no trace of geochemical influence of the adjacent Andean Volcanic Belt and the associated subduction zone. An older oceanic lithosphere that was emplaced during the Proterozoic-Palaeozoic in the area is also involved in magma genesis. The various isotope ratios are typical for so-called "cratonic" Patagonian back-arc basalts that are remote from the Andean Volcanic Belt and resemble ocean island basalts; a role of the Bouvet hotspot of the Atlantic in generating them has been discussed.

Geologic record 

The basement beneath Pali-Aike contains the Magallanes Basin of Jurassic age, which formed during the breakup of Gondwana and was later filled by volcanic and sedimentary rocks. The mantle underneath Pali-Aike is up to 2.5billion years old. The partly Neoproterozoic Deseado Massif lies north of Pali-Aike and may extend beneath the field to Tierra del Fuego; there is no evidence that a Precambrian basement exists in the Pali-Aike area. During the Oligocene a marine transgression deposited the Patagonia Formation, and during the Miocene fluvial sediments formed the Santa Cruz Formation. Sedimentation ceased in the region 14million years ago, probably because by that time the rain shadow of the Andes was effective in the area. At that time, the Chile Ridge first collided with the Peru–Chile Trench west of Tierra del Fuego; since then the collision zone has migrated north to the Taitao Peninsula off western Chile.

Moraines occur west and south from the volcanic field. The Pali-Aike area was glaciated during the middle Pleistocene, and glaciers eroded contemporary lava flows. In part on the basis of the dates of these lava flows, it was established that the older and larger glaciation (Bella Vista Glaciation) occurred between 1.17and 1.02million years ago. The last glaciation (Cabo Vírgenes, Río Ciaike and Telken VI-I) was less extensive but reached the Atlantic Ocean at times. This glaciation ended before 760,000years ago; there is no evidence of last glacial maximum/Llanquihue glaciation glaciers in the area.

Cause of volcanism

The origin of oceanic-type magmas close to plate boundaries, which occur in other places of the world as well, is usually attributed to slab-dependent processes. The most important among these is the formation of slab windows (gaps in the downgoing plate which allow asthenosphere to ascend) when spreading ridges collide with subduction zones. The slab window generated by the Chile Ridge's subduction passed at the latitudes of Pali-Aike about 4.5million years ago; volcanic activity commenced soon afterwards but the time difference was enough for any subduction-influenced mantle to be displaced by fresher mantle moving through the window, which is the main source of the Pali-Aike volcanic rocks. Eight to sixmillion years ago, a change in the motion of the South America Plate relative to the Scotia Plate caused the onset of a stretching tectonic regime in the Pali-Aike area, thus allowing the ascent of magmas. The large amounts of xenoliths and primitiveness of the magmas suggest that once they had formed, they very quickly rose through the crust to the surface.

Eruptive history 

Volcanic activity at Pali-Aike spans the late Pliocene to Holocene and has been subdivided into the three units U1, U2 and U3. The oldest U1 unit consists of basaltic plateaus, while U2 and U3 are individual vents with accompanying lava flows. An additional Miocene volcanic stage ("Basaltos Bella Vista") crops out at the northwestern end of the volcanic field and is heavily eroded. There is no evidence of a systematic migration of vent sites. Potassium–argon dating has yielded ages of between 3.78and 0.17million years ago. The age of Potrok Aike is not known with certainty but its minimum age on the basis of sediment core data is 240,000years before present.

Volcanic deposits have covered archaeological artifacts at the Pali-Aike Cave, indicating volcanic activity between 10,000and 5,000years before present and within the last 15,000 years; the Global Volcanism Program mentions a 5,550 ± 2,500 BCE eruption. Sediment cores from Laguna Azul give an approximate age of 3,400years before present, suggesting that this vent formed during the late Holocene. Tephra deposits in the region may have originated at Pali-Aike. The volcanic field was rated Argentina's 18th (out of 38) most dangerous volcano in a 2016 study.

Climate, vegetation and fauna 

These patterns are owing to the closeness of Antarctica, the cold Humboldt current and Falklands current ocean currents and the rain shadow of the Andes. Some maars and craters in Pali-Aike have been used for palaeoclimatological research, in the form of sediment core analysis, such as Laguna Azul, Potrok Aike and Magallanes Maar.

The regional vegetation is grassland and shrubs. The dominant grass species is Festuca gracillima, although Festuca pallescens has been described as the dominant species in the wetter west. Festuca is accompanied by bushes of Chiliotrichum diffusum and red crowberry in the wetter regions and by bushes of Nardophyllum bryoides and Nassauvia ulicina in the drier regions. Various herbs and dicots complete the regional flora. The highly permeable basalts intercept precipitation, forming active aquifers that feed into wetlands. Animal species present in the Chilean national park include armadillos, gray foxes, guanacos, Humboldt's hog-nosed skunks, pumas and red foxes. Bird species include Chloephaga and Theristicus species, black-chested buzzard-eagles, cinereous harriers, crested caracaras, harriers, kestrels, peregrine falcons, rheas and southern lapwings, but also aquatic birds like Calidris species, Coscoroba swans, flamingos, two-banded plovers, yellow-billed pintails and yellow-billed teals.

Palaeorecords indicate that ecological conditions varied from place to place in the wider region and during the last 50,000years. Caves have yielded fossils of animals that lived there during the Holocene and Pleistocene such as big cats and ground sloths, although the former fauna in the region is poorly studied. Since the arrival of Europeans in the late 19th century, invasive European weeds and sheep farming have altered the regional ecosystem.

Archaeology and human history 

Early humans inhabited the Pali-Aike region since about 10,000years ago, including various caves such as Fell Cave, Pali-Aike cave, Condor 1, Cueva del Puma, Las Buitreras, Orejas de Burro but also non-cave sites such as Laguna Thomas Gould. Human use of Fell Cave goes back at least 8,000years and their presence at Pali-Aike is among the oldest human activities in Patagonia. Archaeological research in the volcanic field began in the 1930s.

Prehistoric human activity was concentrated in the southern, wetter sector of the volcanic field. The lakes and the volcanic landscape have a reliable supply of water and offered refuge to these people, drawing them to the volcanic field; in turn they might have settled the rest of the wider region starting from Pali-Aike. They left archaeological sites, petroglyphs, rock carvings and stone tools behind; even some ancient burials have been found. The volcanic field was a source of volcanic rocks such as obsidian for the manufacturing of archaeological artifacts but, perhaps because of the low quality of the rocks, they had only limited use. Weathered volcanic rocks from the Pali-Aike volcanic field were used as red pigments.

Today sheep are farmed in the volcanic field. On the Chilean side, the Pali-Aike volcanic field is part of the Pali-Aike National Park and a few volcanic centres have been investigated as possible geosites. Laguna Azul is already a provincial geosite and tourism target. The Pali-Aike National Park was created in 1970 on the Chilean side and the Laguna Azul Provincial Reserve on the Argentine side, which encompasses Laguna Azul, in 2005.

See also 
 Carrán-Los Venados, another volcanic field with very large maars in Chile

Notes

References

Sources 

 
 
 
 
 
 
 
 
 
 
 
 
 
 
 
 
 
 
 

Andean Volcanic Belt
Volcanic fields
Volcanoes of Santa Cruz Province, Argentina
Volcanoes of Magallanes Region
Geology of Patagonia
Volcanic crater lakes
Cinder cones of Chile
Maars of Argentina
Pleistocene volcanoes
Holocene volcanoes
Inactive volcanoes
Pleistocene South America
Quaternary South America
Argentina–Chile border